The Comte de Saint Germain (– 27 February 1784) was a European adventurer, with an interest in science, alchemy and the arts. He achieved prominence in European high society of the mid-18th century. Prince Charles of Hesse-Kassel considered him to be "one of the greatest philosophers who ever lived". St. Germain used a variety of names and titles, an accepted practice amongst royalty and nobility at the time. These include the Marquis de Montferrat, Comte Bellamarre, Chevalier Schoening, Count Weldon, Comte Soltikoff, Manuel Doria, Graf Tzarogy, and Prinz Ragoczy. To deflect enquiries as to his origins, he would make far-fetched claims, such as being 500 years old, leading Voltaire to sarcastically dub him "The Wonderman" and that "He is a man who does not die, and who knows everything".

His real name is unknown while his birth and background are obscure, but towards the end of his life, he claimed that he was a son of Prince Francis II Rákóczi of Transylvania. His name has occasionally caused him to be confused with Claude Louis, Comte de Saint-Germain, a noted French general.

Background
The count claimed to be a son of Francis II Rákóczi, the Prince of Transylvania, which could possibly be unfounded. However, this would account for his wealth and fine education. The will of Francis II Rákóczi mentions his eldest son, Leopold George, who was believed to have died at the age of four. The speculation is that his identity was safeguarded as a protective measure from the persecutions against the Habsburg dynasty. At the time of his arrival in Schleswig in 1779, St. Germain told Prince Charles of Hesse-Kassel that he was 88 years old. This would place his birth in 1691 when Francis II Rákóczi was 15 years old.

St. Germain was supposedly educated in Italy by the last of the Medicis, Gian Gastone, his alleged mother's brother-in-law. He was believed to be a student at the University of Siena. Throughout his adult life, he deliberately spun a confusing web to conceal his actual name and origins, using different pseudonyms in the different places of Europe that he visited.

Historical figure
He appears to have begun to be known under the title of the Count of St Germain during the early 1740s.

England
According to David Hunter, the count contributed some of the songs to L'incostanza delusa, an opera performed at the Haymarket Theatre in London on all but one of the Saturdays from 9 February to 20 April 1745. Later, in a letter of December of that same year, Horace Walpole mentions Count St. Germain as being arrested in London on suspicion of espionage (this was during the Jacobite rebellion of 1745), but released without charge:

The other day they seized an odd man, who goes by the name of Count St. Germain. He has been here these two years, and will not tell who he is, or whence, but professes [two wonderful things, the first] that he does not go by his right name; and the second that he never had any dealings with any woman – nay, nor with any succedaneum. He sings, plays on the violin wonderfully, composes, is mad, and not very sensible. He is called an Italian, a Spaniard, a Pole; somebody that married a great fortune in Mexico, and ran away with her jewels to Constantinople; a priest, a fiddler, a vast nobleman. The Prince of Wales has had an unsatiated curiosity about him, but in vain. However, nothing has been made out against him; he is released; and, what convinces me that he is not a gentleman, stays here, and talks of his being taken up for a spy.

The Count gave two private musical performances in London in April and May 1749. On one such occasion, Lady Jemima Yorke described how she was "very much entertain'd by him or at him the whole Time – I mean the Oddness of his Manner which it is impossible not to laugh at, otherwise you know he is very sensible & well-bred in conversation". She continued: He is an Odd Creature, and the more I see him the more curious I am to know something about him. He is everything with everybody: he talks Ingeniously with Mr Wray, Philosophy with Lord Willoughby, and is gallant with Miss Yorke, Miss Carpenter, and all the Young Ladies. But the Character and Philosopher is what he seems to pretend to, and to be a good deal conceited of: the Others are put on to comply with Les Manieres du Monde, but that you are to suppose his real characteristic; and I can't but fancy he is a great Pretender in All kinds of Science, as well as that he really has acquired an uncommon Share in some.

Walpole reports that St Germain: spoke Italian and French with the greatest facility, though it was evident that neither was his language; he understood Polish and soon learnt to understand English and talk it a little [...] But Spanish or Portuguese seemed his natural language. Walpole concludes that the Count was "a man of Quality who had been in or designed for the Church. He was too great a musician not to have been famous if he had not been a gentleman". Walpole describes the Count as pale, with "extremely black" hair and a beard. "He dressed magnificently, [and] had several jewels" and was clearly receiving "large remittances, but made no other figure".

France
St. Germain appeared in the French court around 1748. In 1749, he was employed by Louis XV for diplomatic missions.

A mime and English comedian known as Mi'Lord Gower impersonated St. Germain in Paris salons. His stories were wilder than the real count's (he had advised Jesus, for example). Inevitably, hearsay of his routine got confused with the original.

Giacomo Casanova describes in his memoirs several meetings with the "celebrated and learned impostor". Of his first meeting, in Paris in 1757, he writes:

The most enjoyable dinner I had was with Madame de Robert Gergi, who came with the famous adventurer, known by the name of the Count de St. Germain. This individual, instead of eating, talked from the beginning of the meal to the end, and I followed his example in one respect as I did not eat, but listened to him with the greatest attention. It may safely be said that as a conversationalist he was unequalled.
St. Germain gave himself out for a marvel and always aimed at exciting amazement, which he often succeeded in doing. He was a scholar, linguist, musician, and chemist, good-looking, and a perfect ladies' man. For a while he gave them paints and cosmetics; he flattered them, not that he would make them young again (which he modestly confessed was beyond him) but that their beauty would be preserved by means of a wash which, he said, cost him a lot of money, but which he gave away freely.
He had contrived to gain the favour of Madame de Pompadour, who had spoken about him to the king, for whom he had made a laboratory, in which the monarch – a martyr to boredom – tried to find a little pleasure or distraction, at all events, by making dyes. The king had given him a suite of rooms at Chambord, and a hundred thousand francs for the construction of a laboratory, and according to St. Germain the dyes discovered by the king would have a materially beneficial influence on the quality of French fabrics.
This extraordinary man, intended by nature to be the king of impostors and quacks, would say in an easy, assured manner that he was three hundred years old, that he knew the secret of the Universal Medicine, that he possessed a mastery over nature, that he could melt diamonds, professing himself capable of forming, out of ten or twelve small diamonds, one large one of the finest water without any loss of weight. All this, he said, was a mere trifle to him. Notwithstanding his boastings, his bare-faced lies, and his manifold eccentricities, I cannot say I thought him offensive. In spite of my knowledge of what he was and in spite of my own feelings, I thought him an astonishing man as he was always astonishing me.

Dutch Republic
In March 1760, at the height of the Seven Years' War, St. Germain travelled to The Hague. In Amsterdam, he stayed at the bankers Adrian and Thomas Hope and pretended he came to borrow money for Louis XV with diamonds as collateral. He assisted Bertrand Philip, Count of Gronsveld starting a porcelain factory in Weesp as furnace and colour specialist. St. Germain tried to open peace negotiations between Britain and France with the help of Duke Louis Ernest of Brunswick-Lüneburg. British diplomats concluded that St. Germain had the backing of the Duc de Belle-Isle and possibly of Madame de Pompadour, who were trying to outmanoeuvre the French Foreign Minister, the pro-Austrian Duc de Choiseul. However, Britain would not treat with St. Germain unless his credentials came directly from the French king. The Duc de Choiseul convinced Louis XV to disavow St. Germain and demand his arrest. Count Bentinck de Rhoon, a Dutch diplomat, regarded the arrest warrant as internal French politicking, in which Holland should not involve itself. However, a direct refusal to extradite St. Germain was also considered impolitic. De Rhoon, therefore, facilitated the departure of St. Germain to England with a passport issued by the British Ambassador, General Joseph Yorke. This passport was made out "in blank", allowing St. Germain to travel in May 1760 from Hellevoetsluis to London under an assumed name, showing that this practice was officially accepted at the time.

From St. Peterburg, St. Germain travelled to Berlin, Vienna, Milan, Ubbergen, and Zutphen (June 1762), Amsterdam (August 1762), Venice (1769), Livorno (1770), Neurenberg (1772), Mantua (1773), The Hague (1774), and Bad Schwalbach.

Death
In 1779, St. Germain arrived in Altona in Schleswig, where he made an acquaintance with Prince Charles of Hesse-Kassel, who also had an interest in mysticism and was a member of several secret societies. The count showed the Prince several of his gems and he convinced the latter that he had invented a new method of colouring cloth. The Prince was impressed and installed the Count in an abandoned factory at Eckernförde he had acquired especially for the Count, and supplied him with the materials and cloths that St. Germain needed to proceed with the project. The two met frequently in the following years, and the Prince outfitted a laboratory for alchemical experiments in his nearby summer residence Louisenlund, where they, among other things, cooperated in creating gemstones and jewelry. The prince later recounts in a letter that he was the only person in whom the count truly confided. He told the prince that he was the son of the Transylvanian Prince Francis II Rákóczi, and that he had been 88 years of age when he arrived in Schleswig.

The count died in his residence in the factory on 27 February 1784, while the prince was staying in Kassel, and the death was recorded in the register of the St. Nicolai Church in Eckernförde. He was buried 2 March and the cost of the burial was listed in the accounting books of the church the following day. The official burial site for the count is at Nicolai Church (German St. Nicolaikirche) in Eckernförde.  He was buried in a private grave. On 3 April the same year, the mayor and the city council of Eckernförde issued an official proclamation about the auctioning off of the count's remaining effects in case no living relative would appear within a designated time period to lay claim on them. Prince Charles donated the factory to the crown and it was afterward converted into a hospital.

Jean Overton Fuller found, during her research, that the count's estate upon his death was a packet of paid and receipted bills and quittances, 82 Reichsthalers and 13 shillings (cash), 29 various groups of items of clothing (this includes gloves, stockings, trousers, shirts, etc.), 14 linen shirts, eight other groups of linen items, and various sundries (razors, buckles, toothbrushes, sunglasses, combs, etc.).  No diamonds, jewels, gold, or any other riches were listed, nor were kept cultural items from travels, personal items (like his violin), or any notes of correspondence.

Music by the Count
The following list of music comes from Appendix II from Jean Overton Fuller's book The Comte de Saint Germain.

Trio Sonatas
Six sonatas for two violins with a bass for harpsichord or violoncello:
 Op. 47 I. F major, Molto adagio
 Op. 48 II. B-flat major, Allegro
 Op. 49 III. E-flat major, Adagio
 Op. 50 IV. G minor, Tempo giusto
 Op. 51 V. G major, Moderato
 Op. 52 VI. A major, Cantabile lento

Violin solos
Seven solos for solo violin:
 Op. 53 I. B-flat major, Largo
 Op. 54 II. E major, Adagio
 Op. 55 III. C minor, Adagio
 Op. 56 IV. E-flat major, Adagio
 Op. 57 V. E-flat major, Adagio
 Op. 58 VI. A major, Adagio
 Op. 59 VII. B-flat major, Adagio

English songs
 Op. 4 The Maid That's Made for Love and Me (O Wouldst Thou Know What Sacred Charms). E-flat major (marked B-flat major), 
 Op. 5 It Is Not that I Love You Less. F major, 
 Op. 6 Gentle Love, This Hour Befriend Me. D major, 
 Op. 7 Jove, When He Saw My Fanny's Face. D major,

Italian arias
Numbered in order of their appearance in the Musique Raisonnee, with their page numbers in that volume.
* 
 Op. 1 IV, pp. 16–20. Senza pietà mi credi,* G major,  (marked  but there are 6 quavers to the bar)
 Op. 2 VIII, pp. 36–39. Digli, digli,* D major, 
 Op. 3 IX, pp. 40–45. Per pieta bel Idol mio,* F major, 
 Op. 4/17 XIII, pp. 58–61. Se mai riviene, D minor, 
 Op. 8 I, pp. 1–5. Padre perdona, oh! pene, G minor, 
 Op. 9 II, pp. 6–10. Non piangete amarti, E major, 
 Op. 10 III, pp. 11–15. Intendo il tuo, F major, 
 Op. 11 V, pp. 21–26. Già, già che moria deggio, D major, 
 Op. 12 VI, pp. 27–31. Dille che l'amor mio,* E major, 
 Op. 13 VII, pp. 32–35. Mio ben ricordati, D major, 
 Op. 14 X, pp. 46–50. Non so, quel dolce moto, B  major, 
 Op. 15 XI, pp. 51–55. Piango, è ver; ma non-procede, G minor, 
 Op. 16 XII, pp. 56–57. Dal labbro che t'accende, E major, 
 Op. 18 XIV, pp. 62–63. Parlerò; non-e permesso, E major, 
 Op. 19 XV, pp. 64–65. Se tutti i miei pensieri, A major, 
 Op. 20 XVI, pp. 66–67. Guadarlo, guaralo in volto, E major, 
 Op. 21 XVII, pp. 68–69. Oh Dio mancarmi, D major, 
 Op. 22 XVIII, pp. 70–71. Digli che son fedele, E  major, 
 Op. 23 XIX, pp. 72–73. Pensa che sei cruda, E minor, 
 Op. 24 XX, pp. 74–75. Torna torna innocente, G major, 
 Op. 25 XXI, pp. 76–77. Un certo non-so che veggo, E major, 
 Op. 26 XXII, pp. 78–79. Guardami, guardami prima in volto, D major, 
 Op. 27 XXIII, pp. 80–81. Parto, se vuoi così, E major, 
 Op. 28 XXIV, pp. 82–83. Volga al Ciel se ti, D minor, 
 Op. 29 XXV, pp. 84–85. Guarda se in questa volta, F major, 
 Op. 30 XXVI, pp. 86–87. Quanto mai felice, D major, 
 Op. 31 XXVII, pp. 88–89. Ah che neldi'sti, D major, 
 Op. 32, XXVIII, pp. 90–91. Dopp'un tuo Sguardo, F major, 
 Op. 33 XXIX, pp. 92–93. Serberò fra' Ceppi, G major, 
 Op. 34 XXX, pp. 94–95. Figlio se più non-vivi moro, F major, 
 Op. 35 XXXI, pp. 96–98. Non ti respondo, C major, 
 Op. 36 XXXII, pp. 99–101. Povero cor perché palpito, G major, 
 Op. 37 XXXIII, pp. 102–105. Non v'è più barbaro, C minor, 
 Op. 38 XXXIV, pp. 106–108. Se de' tuoi lumi al fuoco amor, E major, 
 Op. 39 XXXV, pp. 109–111. Se tutto tosto me sdegno, E major, 
 Op. 40 XXXVI, pp. 112–115. Ai negli occhi un tel incanto, D major,  (marked  but there are 4 crotchets to the bar)
 Op. 41 XXXVII, pp. 116–118. Come poteste de Dio, F major, 
 Op. 42 XXXVIII, pp. 119–121. Che sorte crudele, G major, 
 Op. 43 XXXIX, pp. 122–124. Se almen potesse al pianto, G minor, 
 Op. 44 XXXX, pp. 125–127. Se viver non-posso lunghi, D major, 
 Op. 45 XXXXI, pp. 128–130. Fedel faro faro cara cara, D major, 
 Op. 46 XXXXII, p. 131. Non ha ragione, F major,

Literature about the Count

Biographies
The best-known biography is Isabel Cooper-Oakley's The Count of St. Germain (1912), which gives a satisfactory biographical sketch. It is a compilation of letters, diaries, and private records written about the count by members of the French aristocracy who knew him in the 18th century. Another interesting biographical sketch can be found in The History of Magic, by Eliphas Levi, originally published in 1913.

In his work Sages and Seers (1959), Manly Palmer Hall refers to the biography Graf St.-Germain by E. M. Oettinger (1846).

Books attributed to the Count
Discounting the snippets of political intrigue, a few musical pieces, and one mystical poem, there are only two pieces of writing attributed to the Count: La Très Sainte Trinosophie and the untitled Triangular Manuscript.

The first book attributed to the Count of Saint Germain is La Très Sainte Trinosophie (The Most Holy Trinosophia), a beautifully illustrated 18th century manuscript that describes in symbolic terms a journey of spiritual initiation or an alchemical process, depending on the interpretation. This book has been published several times, most notably by Manly P. Hall, in Los Angeles, California, in 1933. The attribution to St. Germain rests on a handwritten note scrawled inside the cover of the original manuscript stating that this was a copy of a text once in St. Germain's possession. However, despite Hall's elaborate introduction describing the Count's legend, The Most Holy Trinosophia shows no definitive connection to him.

The second work attributed to St. Germain is the untitled 18th century manuscript in the shape of a triangle. The two known copies of the Triangular Manuscript exist as Hogart Manuscript 209 and 210 (MS 209 and MS 210). Both currently reside in the Manly Palmer Hall Collection of Alchemical Manuscripts at the Getty Research Library. Nick Koss decoded and translated this manuscript in 2011 and it was published as The Triangular Book of St. Germain by Ouroboros Press in 2015. Unlike the first work, it mentions St. Germain directly as its originator. The book describes a magical ritual by which one can perform the two most extraordinary feats that characterized the legend of Count of St. Germain, namely procurement of great wealth and extension of life.

In Theosophy

Myths, legends, and speculations about St. Germain began to be widespread in the late 19th and early 20th centuries and continue today. They include beliefs that he is immortal, the Wandering Jew, an alchemist with the elixir of life, a Rosicrucian, and that he prophesied the French Revolution. He is said to have met the forger Giuseppe Balsamo (alias Cagliostro) in London and the composer Rameau in Venice. Some groups honor Saint Germain as a supernatural being called an ascended master.

In fiction

The count has inspired a number of fictional creations:

 He appears as a playable character in the Japanese otome game series Ikemen Vampire. In the series, he is the sire and the host for those who he has given a second lease in life including Napoleon Bonaparte, Isaac Newton, Sir Arthur Conan Doyle, Leonardo da Vinci, William Shakespeare, Wolfgang Amadeus Mozart, Vincent van Gogh, Theo Van Gogh, Jeanne d'Arc (who is named as Jean d'Arc and is a man), and Osamu Dazai. The series portrays him as a kind, mild-mannered, intelligent, respectable and respected nobleman of immeasurable wealth as well as a protective father or older sibling figure to all his residents including his human butler.
 He appears as the Master manipulator behind the scenes in Katherine Kurtz' 1996 novel, Two Crowns for America, about America's fight for independence.
 He figures prominently in various works by Japanese rock artist Kamijo, including the album Sang and the single "Persona Grata".
 He is a character in Castlevania: Curse of Darkness, where he is a time traveler. He fights with Zead, who is the avatar of Death.
 He is a character in Netflix's 2017 Castlevania, appearing as an itinerant magician in search of the "Infinite Corridor" voiced by Bill Nighy.
 He is a significant character in Diana Gabaldon's Outlander series, specifically 1992's Dragonfly in Amber, and an apparent time traveler in Gabaldon's spin-off novella, "The Space Between".
 He is introduced as a supporting character in the novel The Magician, the second book in the fantasy series The Secrets of the Immortal Nicholas Flamel by Michael Scott.
 He is mentioned in Raidou Kuzunoha vs. The Soulless Army as a time agent, yet the player never meets him.
 He is played by James Marsters in the TV series Warehouse 13. He is an immortal who used a ring with a gem from the Philosopher's stone used to revitalize plants and heal people to accumulate wealth throughout the ages. The ring was taken by Marie-Antoinette and buried in the Catacombs beneath Paris.
 He is portrayed by Miya Rurika in the play Azure Moment by Takarazuka Revue.
 He is the main antagonist in The Ruby Red Trilogy, written by Kerstin Gier. He is the founder of a secret lodge which is controlling people with a time-travelling gene, and he is trying to gain immortality through the said time-travellers.
 He is the main character of the historical mystery novel based on his early adventures, The Man Who Would Not Die, written by Paul Andrews. He is presented as the son of Prince Rákóczi.
 He is the mentor and co-conspirator of the player in the 2022 indie adventure game, Card Shark.
 He was referenced as a villain in the fourth season of the anime Symphogear, along with Alessandro Cagliostro and François Prelati, all portrayed as women.
 Hoshino Katsura used him as inspiration for the character of the Millennium Earl in the manga series D. Gray Man.
 In Kōta Hirano's Drifters, the character of count Saint Germi is inspired by him. He is voiced by Tomokazu Sugita in the anime adaptation.
 In Master of Mosquiton Mosquiton's enemy is an immortal demon loosely based on the Count of St. Germain.
 In the BBC podcast The Lovecraft Investigations, he is revealed to be the mortal guise of Nyarlathotep and a central antagonist of the series.
 In the light novel Fate/strange fake, he was Richard the Lionheart's court mage and mentor, who claimed to be nothing more than an aristocrat and a swindler while also owning a car, claiming to have met Alexander the Great, and being able to sense and talk to the person witnessing the flashback of his first meeting with King Richard.
 In the manga The Case Study of Vanitas, Noe's teacher and Dominique's grandfather tells them he is currently going by that name.
 In the novelization The Night Strangler, from the TV film of the same title, it is strongly hinted that the immortal villain, Dr. Richard Malcolm, is actually the Count St. Germain. When asked directly, Malcolm laughs ironically but does not deny it.
 In The Red Lion: The Elixer of Life by Maria Szepes, he appears as Saint Germain
 In the tabletop role-playing game Unknown Armies by John Scott Tynes and Greg Stolze, he is the First and Last Man, the only immortal character in the setting, whose lifespan encompasses the first and last lives of human beings.
 Prominent Bengali fiction author Shariful Hasan made the character Count Saint Germain in his Samvala Trilogy inspired by him.
 Robert Rankin's character Professor Slocombe, in the various books of The Brentford Trilogy, is often described as bearing an uncanny resemblance to the Comte; when the Professor annotates the Comte's ancient notebooks, even the handwriting is nearly identical. Another character, now quite old, born in the Victorian era, has stated that Professor Slocombe was an old man even then.
 The character of Agliè in the novel Foucault's Pendulum by Umberto Eco is an occultist who claims to be the Count St. Germain.
 The character of Jack Elderflower in the novel Gather the Fortunes, by Bryan Camp.
 The Comte is a significant character in the Victorian time-travel novella, A Peculiar Count in Time, by M .K. Beutymhill.
 The Comte is the main protagonist in an ongoing series of historical romance/horror novels by Chelsea Quinn Yarbro.
 The Count appears in two novels by Andrzej Sarwa: Wieszczba krwawej głowy (The Prophetess of the Bloody Head) and Cmentarz św. Medarda (Saint Medard's Graveyard).
 The German writer Karl May wrote two stories with the Graf von Saint Germain appearing as antagonist: Aqua benedetta (1877) and its largely extended version Ein Fürst des Schwindels (1880).
 The mystic in the Alexander Pushkin story "The Queen of Spades".
 The visual novel Code: Realize − Guardian of Rebirth depicts him as an eccentric aristocrat hosting Arsène Lupin, Impey Barbicane, Victor Frankenstein, and Van Helsing in his manor.

References

Further reading
 Chrissochoidis, Ilias. "The Music of the Count of St. Germain: An Edition", Society for Eighteenth-Century Music Newsletter 16 (April 2010), [6–7].
 Cooper-Oakley, Isabella. The Comte De Saint Germain, the Secret of Kings. 2nd ed. London: Whitefriars Press, 1912.
 d'Adhemar, Madame Comtesse le. "Souvenirs Sur Marie-Antoinette." Paris: Impremerie de Bourgogne et Martinet, 1836.
 Fleming, Thomas. "The Magnificent Fraud." American Heritage, February 2006 (2006).
 Hausset, Madame du. "The Private Memoirs of Louis XV: Taken from the Memoirs of Madame Du Hausset, Lady's Maid to Madame De Pompadour." ed Nichols Harvard University, 1895.
 Hunter, David. "The Great Pretender." Musical Times, no. Winter 2003 (2003).
 Marie Antoinette von Lowzow, Saint-Germain – Den mystiske greve, Dansk Historisk Håndbogsforlag, Copenhagen, 1984. . (in Danish).
 Melton, J. Gordon Encyclopedia of American Religions 5th Edition New York:1996 Gale Research   Chapter 18--"The Ancient Wisdom Family of Religions" Pages 151–158; see chart on page 154 listing Masters of the Ancient Wisdom; Also see Section 18, Pages 717-757 Descriptions of various Ancient Wisdom religious organizations
 Pope-Hennessey, Una. The Comte De Saint-Germain. Reprint ed, Secret Societies and the French Revolution.  Together with Some Kindred Studies by Una Birch. Lexington, Kentucky: Forgotten Books, 1911.
 SAINT GERMAIN ON ADVANCED ALCHEMY, by David Christopher Lewis, Meru press, 
 Saint-Germain, Count de, ed. The Music of the Comte St.Germain. Edited by Manley Hall. Los Angeles, California: Philosophical Research Society, 1981.
 Saint-Germain, Count de. The Most Holy Trinosophia. Forgotten Books, N.D. Reprint, 2008.
 Slemen, Thomas. Strange but True. London: Robinson Publishing, 1998.
 Walpole, Horace. "Letters of Horace Walpole." ed Charles Duke Yonge. New York: Putman's Sons, 9 December 1745.

External links

 The Comte de St. Germain (1912) by Isabel Cooper-Oakley, at sacred-texts.com

1784 deaths
18th-century alchemists
18th-century Hungarian people
18th-century occultists
18th-century philosophers
Forteana
Hungarian philosophers
Longevity myths
Members of the Kit-Kat Club
Rákóczi family
Unidentified people
Year of birth uncertain